Tru by Hilton is an American brand of hotels trademarked by Hilton Worldwide.

History 
The hotel brand was announced in January 2016 at the Americas Lodging Investment Summit in Los Angeles. It was designed to compete against Comfort Inn and La Quinta, and the first Tru by Hilton hotels were expected to open late in the same year. The goal was to create rooms of 228 square feet with "clever" bathrooms. The brand uses platform beds instead of box springs and uses a landing zone where guests can place their luggage and hang their clothes rather than a dresser. Hilton realized that they could shrink the width of the room from the typical 12 feet to 10 feet because typically the TV cabinet would take up 2 feet, but with flat screen TV's the space could be spared. The desk that was decided to be used is a portable chair attached to a table allowing the guest to use the chair wherever they want in the room. As of February 17, 2021, it has 178 properties with 17,403 rooms in two countries and territories, all franchised.

Operations 

Tru by Hilton will operate as a franchise, under Hilton. When the launch of the new brand was announced, Tru by Hilton had already signed over 100 franchise agreements.  The brand will occupy the mid-scale hotel market. The hotels will offer limited food and beverage options and feature a social area characterized by a large central lobby, referred to as The Hive, that is divided into sections for eating, working, playing and lounging. The front desk, called the Command Center, will also have a social media wall to engage guests.

Tru by Hilton was designed to be scalable so that properties could vary in size and still fit in urban, suburban, airport or highway adjacent settings. All of the brand's hotels will be newly built or created through the re-purposing of existing buildings. The brand's initial locations will be in the Atlanta, Cheyenne, WY, Dallas, Houston, Chicago, St. Louis: St. Charles, Missouri, Denver, Portland, Boise, ID, Oklahoma City and Nashville markets.

References

External links

Hotel chains in the United States
Hilton Hotels & Resorts hotels
American companies established in 2016
Hotels established in 2016